St Joseph's Church is a Roman Catholic Parish church in Stockport, Greater Manchester, England. It was built from 1861 to 1862 and designed by Matthew Ellison Hadfield. It is situated on St Petersgate, south west  of the High Street. It is the only church in England administered by the Priests of the Sacred Heart and is a Grade II listed building.

History

Foundation
During the late 18th century, the local Catholic population in Stockport were served by priests from Manchester. In 1798, a Fr James Blundell was saying Mass in a house on Windmill Street. In 1803, a permanent chapel was built on Chapel Street and called St Philip and St James. In the first half of the nineteenth century, the Catholic congregation increased with the influx of workers at Stockport’s mills. In 1845, a priest would come from the chapel (which in 1905 would be replaced by Our Lady and the Apostles Church in Edgeley) to the centre of Stockport to say Mass in a temporary school in Parson’s Yard. In 1858, the schools on Tatton Street were built. They were designed by Matthew Ellison Hadfield and George Goldie.

Construction
In 1861, the foundation stone for the church was laid by the Bishop of Salford, William Turner. In 1862, a watercolour was made by M. E. Hadfield showing the west end interior of the church. It now hangs in the west end of the nave. In 1888, an industrial school, linked to the church, was built to the south of the school. It was part-funded by the Henry Fitzalan-Howard, 15th Duke of Norfolk.

Parish
The church has two Sunday Masses, they are at 5:00pm on Saturday and 11:30am on Sunday.

Interior

See also

 Listed buildings in Stockport
 Roman Catholic Diocese of Shrewsbury
 Priests of the Sacred Heart
 List of churches in Greater Manchester

References

External links

 St Joseph's Church, Stockport from Diocese of Shrewsbury
 Sacred Heart Fathers British-Irish Province

Roman Catholic churches in Greater Manchester
Grade II listed churches in the Metropolitan Borough of Stockport
Grade II listed Roman Catholic churches in England
Gothic Revival church buildings in England
Gothic Revival architecture in Greater Manchester
Roman Catholic churches completed in 1862
1861 establishments in England
19th-century Roman Catholic church buildings in the United Kingdom
Roman Catholic Diocese of Shrewsbury
Matthew Ellison Hadfield buildings